Bab Gask (also Romanized as Bāb Gask) is a village in Javar Rural District, in the Central District of Kuhbanan County, Kerman Province, Iran. At the 2006 census, its population was 111, in 26 families.

References 

Populated places in Kuhbanan County